Myra Sally Hunter is Professor of Clinical Health Psychology at the Institute of Psychiatry, Psychology and Neuroscience, King's College, London, and a Clinical and Health Psychologist at the South London and Maudsley NHS Foundation Trust.

Research 
Hunter's research specialises in the areas of  psychological approaches in women's health, cardiology and oncology. She has developed and evaluated cognitive behavioral interventions for women with cardiac chest pain, premenstrual and more recently menopausal problems (including well women and women who have had breast cancer).

She is currently applying the interventions to men who have hot flushes following prostate cancer treatment and is evaluating a brief cognitive behavioral intervention for women who are depressed during pregnancy.

Positions held 
She is a member of the UK National Cancer Research Institute Breast Clinical Studies Group (NCRI Breast CSG) that has established a multi-disciplinary working party to evaluate & improve vasomotor symptom management (2013-2015) and Expert Psychology Advisor to the Core DevelopmentGroup for NICE Guidance on Menopause 2013–2015.

Selected publications

References

Year of birth missing (living people)
Living people
Alumni of King's College London
Academics of King's College London
British psychologists